Martine Carrillon-Couvreur (born 21 March 1948) is a member of the National Assembly of France.  She represented the 1st constituency of the Nièvre department from 2002 to 2017,  and is a member of the Socialiste, radical, citoyen et divers gauche.

References

1948 births
Living people
Socialist Party (France) politicians
Women members of the National Assembly (France)
Deputies of the 12th National Assembly of the French Fifth Republic
Deputies of the 13th National Assembly of the French Fifth Republic
Deputies of the 14th National Assembly of the French Fifth Republic
21st-century French women politicians